Jamize Robert Olawale (born April 17, 1989) is an American football fullback who is a free agent. He was signed by the Dallas Cowboys as an undrafted free agent in 2012. He played college football at North Texas.

Early years
In August 1998, Jamize began playing Pop Warner football for the San Bruno Rams in Northern California where he and his older brother would begin their gridiron journey. Jamize playing RB while big brother (Millicent Olawale) was the star QB. Both being standout players, it was clear to his coaches and peers they would have a bright future in the sport. He being a respectful young man, exceptional student as well as an athlete, all attest to his Father’s strict but meaningful upbringing.

SB Rams: 98-2000

SF Jr49ers: 2000-2001

Olawale attended three high schools: Long Beach Poly High School, De La Salle High School, and St. Ignatius College Preparatory.

College career
Olawale played two seasons at El Camino College as a tight end, recording 15 receptions for 338 yards and three touchdowns.

As a junior, he transferred to the University of North Texas, where he was switched to H-back, recording seven receptions for 79 yards. In his senior season, he was moved to wide receiver, appearing in eight games and recording two receptions for nine yards.

Professional career

Dallas Cowboys
After not being selected in the 2012 NFL Draft, Olawale received a tryout invitation for rookie mini-camp where he was converted from wide receiver to full back, and performed well enough to be signed as an undrafted free agent on May 14.

Although he enjoyed a successful preseason, he was waived on August 31, after the team decided to keep Phillip Tanner. Olawale was then signed to the team's practice squad.

Oakland Raiders
On December 4, 2012, the Oakland Raiders hampered by injuries to running backs Darren McFadden and Mike Goodson, signed Olawale from the Dallas Cowboys practice squad. He appeared in three games during the season as a fullback.

Olawale would become a core special teams player. In 2013, he recorded eight special teams tackles (third on the team). In addition, he had seven receptions for 63 yards.

On December 21, 2014, he scored his first professional touchdown against the Buffalo Bills. In the next game, he had another receiving touchdown, this time against the Denver Broncos. He recorded 5 receptions for 18 yards, 2 receiving touchdowns and 7 special teams tackles.

On December 8, 2015, he was signed to a three-year contract extension. On November 8, against the Pittsburgh Steelers, he had a 19-yard rushing touchdown. He posted 24 carries for 110 rushing yards and a rushing touchdown to go along with nine receptions for 84 yards and 10 special teams tackles (led the team). 

On November 21, 2016, against the Houston Texans, he had a 75-yard receiving touchdown from quarterback Derek Carr in the 27–20 victory at Azteca Stadium. He finished the season with 17 carries for 47 rushing yards, 12 receptions for 227 receiving yards, one receiving touchdown and 2 special teams tackles. 

His production dipped in the 2017 season but he still recorded nine rushes for 43 yards and a rushing touchdown to go along with six receptions for 33 receiving yards and 3 special teams tackles.

Dallas Cowboys (second stint)
In March 2018, the Raiders traded Olawale and a 2018 sixth-round pick (#192-Jamil Demby) to the Dallas Cowboys in exchange for a fifth-round choice (#73-Johnny Townsend). He appeared in 16 games with 4 starts, registering 2 receptions for 13 yards and 13 special teams tackles (led the team).

On March 13, 2019, Olawale signed a three-year, $5.4 million contract extension with the Cowboys. He appeared in 16 games with 5 starts, collecting 5 special teams tackles (tied for fifth on the team). Although he was expected to contribute in the passing game, he could not record an offensive statistic during the season.

On March 10, 2020, Olawale's second-year option was exercised by the Cowboys. On August 2, 2020, Olawale announced he would opt out of the 2020 season due to the COVID-19 pandemic. He was released after the season on March 10, 2021.

References

External links

Oakland Raiders bio
Raiders' Jamize Olawale has special role with team

1989 births
Living people
American football running backs
Dallas Cowboys players
El Camino Warriors football players
North Texas Mean Green football players
Oakland Raiders players
Players of American football from San Francisco
Players of American football from Long Beach, California
Long Beach Polytechnic High School alumni